The Running Actress is a 2017 South Korean comedy-drama film written, directed by, and starring Moon So-ri. The feature consists of three separate short films made in the course of Moon’s enrolment at Chung-Ang University.

Cast

Main
 Moon So-ri as Moon So-ri

Act 1: The Actress 
 Kang Sook as So-ri's friend 1
 Kim Kyung-sun as So-ri's friend 2
 Won Dong-yun as Representative
 Kim Rae-won as Representative's junior 1
 Lee Jung-ik as Representative's junior 2
 Yoon Young-kyun as Manager

Act 2: The Running Actress 
 Seong Byeong-sook as So-ri's mom
 Yoon Cho-hee as Yeon-doo
 Oh Min-ae as PB team leader 
 Lee Jeong-eun as Nursing team leader 
 Seong Jeong-seon as Mother-in-law  
 Sim Hye-gyoo as Caregiver 
 Lee Jung-hyun as Lee Jung-hyun 
 Lee Seung-hoon as Dental clinic director
 Gong Sang-ah as Purser
 Kim Sook-in as Producer Oh
 Kim In-soo as Film director Kim
 Jang Joon-hwan as So-ri's husband

Act 3: The Best Director 
 Yoon Sang-hwa as Park Jeong-rak
 Jeon Yeo-been as Lee Seo-yeong
 Lee Seung-yeon as Director's wife
 Seo Hyo-seung as Director's son 
 Na Kyung-chan as Director (picture)

Awards and nominations

References

External links

The Running Actress at Naver Movies 

2017 films
South Korean comedy-drama films
2017 comedy-drama films
2017 black comedy films
South Korean black comedy films
Films about actors
Self-reflexive films
South Korean anthology films
South Korean independent films
2017 directorial debut films
2017 independent films
2010s South Korean films